Adur (Bangalore South)  is a village in the southern state of Karnataka, India. It is located in the Bangalore South taluk of Bangalore district.

References

External links
 http://Bangalore.nic.in/

Villages in Bangalore Urban district